Argophyllum heterodontum is a plant in the Argophyllaceae family endemic to a small part of north eastern Queensland. It was described and named in 2018.

Taxonomy
This species was first described, along with a number of other new species in this genus, in 2018 by the Australian botanists Anthony Bean and Paul Forster who published it in the Journal Austrobaileya.

Etymology
The genus name Argophyllum is derived from Ancient Greek Árgos meaning white or shining, and phúllon meaning leaf. It refers to the white colouration of the underside of the leaves. The species epithet heterodontum is from héteros meaning different, and odóntos meaning tooth. It refers to the variable size of the teeth on the leaf margin.

Distribution and habitat
A. heterodontum is restricted to a small area of the Wet Tropics of Queensland, mostly in the area of Walsh's Pyramid, and with a disjunct population around Butchers Creek Falls to the south-west. It inhabits open forest and the margins of rainforest on a variety of soils.

Conservation
This species is listed by the Queensland Department of Environment and Science as least concern. , it has not been assessed by the IUCN.

References

External links
 View a map of recorded sightings of Argophyllum heterodontum at the Australasian Virtual Herbarium

Endemic flora of Australia
Flora of Queensland
Taxa named by Paul Irwin Forster
Taxa named by Anthony Bean
Argophyllaceae